The United Nations is an international organization founded in 1945.

United Nations may also refer to:
 The Allies of World War II, often referred to by Franklin D. Roosevelt as the “United Nations”
 United Nations (band)
 United Nations (United Nations album) (2008)
 United Nations (Rui En album) (2008)
 United Nations (gang), a gang in Vancouver, Canada
 United Nations Avenue, in Manila, Philippines
 United Nations Stakes, a Grade I American Thoroughbred horse race

See also
 Declaration by United Nations
 Headquarters of the United Nations, in New York City
 RPA & The United Nations of Sound, a British alternative rock band
 Uniting Nations, a British dance act
 United Nations building (disambiguation)